Charles Chatworthy Wood Taylor, known in Chile as Carlos Wood, (25 April 1792 – 19 February 1856) was a painter, engineer, mariner, and military officer.

He designed the Coat of arms of Chile, which was adopted by the government in 1834, incorporating the huemul and the condor. He also designed the first stamps of the nascent state. He is considered one of the most influential foreign artists who shaped modern painting in Chile.

Biography
He was born on 25 April 1792, son of the Irish John Chatworthy Wood and Susan Taylor.

From boyhood, he demonstrated his skills in art, working in a ceramics factory in the town of Burslem in Staffordshire. He emigrated to the United States in 1817. There, he started business as a landscape painter in Boston, moving his family a year later.

In 1819, he was hired by the U.S. government to embark on a scientific expedition on the frigate Macedonia; this journey took him to the coast of Mexico, Ecuador, Peru, and Chile. He reached Valparaiso in January 1819, after 80 days of sailing, making plans and sketches of the coasts they visited, and drawing ships and port activities for purposes of military study; Lord Cochrane had just sailed to blockade Callao.

Continued toward the Callao and Downes Commander of the frigate Macedonian invited to a dance on board the General San Martín the main hall was decorated with the navies of Wood, and Martin felt impressed to contemplate, and knowing by the captain that the author was on board, manisfestó his desire to know. Presented to St. Martin Wood offered him a position that in the Army, which at first was compelled to refuse for their commitments to scientific expedition.

In August 1820, he was back in Chile, and at the request of Colonel Don Diego Paroissien, aide of General San Martín, accepted the post of Lieutenant of Artillery of the Army of Chile, added to the corps of engineers. On 8 October 1820, he joined the liberating expedition of Peru aboard the vessel San Martín.

Charles Wood Taylor carried out numerous military activities: topographic surveys, plans and locations of the enemy, infiltration of enemy lines, eventually being promoted by San Martin to the rank of Captain of Engineers.

He sailed to serve Peru on the Callao starting on 2 January 1824, arriving at Valparaiso with custom cross the border Arauco.

Sickened by the heavy rains and cold while serving Peru on the Callao, he convalesced in San Fernando. There, he made friends and met the woman who would be his future wife.  He had to convert to Catholicism to marry Dolores Chacon Ramirez de Arellano.

His artwork consists of drawings, portraits, drawings and paintings characterized by descriptive detail. Along with Mauricio Rugendas, he was the painter who showed Chile at the dawn of the republic.

Senior government

In 1824 the Chilean government hired him to a study of the region known as La Frontera, traveling to Concepcion. Actively participated in the fighting of 1829 by the Liberals, he eventually became aide of General Francisco de la Lastra in the Battle of Ochagavía. Thanks to his skills as a draftsman, he was kept on as part of the military engineering team.  He soon met the Spaniard Antonio Arcos, who designed the current flag of Chile on behalf of José Ignacio Zenteno and Pozo Silva.

Charles Wood Taylor designed the Coat of arms of Chile, adopted by the government in 1834, incorporating the huemul and the condor.

Professional life
In 1830, he was appointed professor of drawing the National Institute. He then moved to Valparaiso, where in 1833 he made plans for the
quartermaster of this port, designed the customs clock tower and the railway line to Cerro Alegre, and in 1837, drew the topographic
map of the city. He was appointed inspector of public works of the city, planning the Huth House and Port San Antonio.

In 1842, he raised the level of customs buildings in Talcahuano, then the ports of Coquimbo, Copiapo and Caldera. In 1845 he traced
the route of the railroad from Caldera to Copiapo, built by William Wheelwright. For his connection with England, he was appointed English naval inspector in Valparaiso.

In 1855, he traveled to Europe, as he was suffering from heart disease. He visited Chilean friends living in France, Belgium, and London, England. His health worsened, and he died on 19 February 1856 in London. He was buried in Kensal Green Cemetery.

Works
Participated in urgent work of the new state:

 Enabling and construction of ports of San Antonio, Coquimbo, Copiapo and Caldera.
 In 1833, he designed the topographic maps of Valparaiso.
 In 1842, design drawings customs buildings in Talcahuano.
 In 1845, he designed the route of the first railroad from Caldera to Copiapo who built William Wheelwright.
 However, his main contribution to his adopted country was the national emblem design in 1834 and by the Spanish Antonio Arcos, made the drawing of the current national flag.

Painting
His artwork consists of drawings, portraits, drawings and paintings, mainly in watercolor.  They are characterized by descriptive detail, seeking to capture the picturesque and colorful landscape. He mainly portrayed boats, historical facts, and naval actions. His best known work is paradoxically his only oil painting, the "Wreck of the Arethusa".

Legacy
His son, Charles, served the Chilean army; and his son Jorge Arellano Wood was a famous watercolorist.

References
 www.artistas-americanos.com
 www.icarito.cl

1792 births
1856 deaths
British expatriates in Chile
English people of Irish descent
19th-century Chilean people
People from Burslem